The Indonesian Game Rating System (IGRS) is a video game content rating system founded by the Indonesian Ministry of Communication and Informatics in 2016. There are 5 classifications of ratings based on the game content, which includes the use of alcohol, cigarettes, drugs, violence, blood, language, sexual content, etc.

IGRS generally assigns age ratings for games that are developed and published in Indonesia, but they also provide age ratings for imported games that are verified as official Indonesian products. Starting as of late 2019, only some physical PlayStation titles are officially verified for sale in Indonesia, such as the PlayStation 4 versions of Death Stranding and Minecraft.

Age ratings

References

External links 
 
 Ministry of Communication and Information Technology

Organizations established in 2016
Censorship in Indonesia
Video game content ratings systems
Video game organizations
Video gaming in Indonesia